The Military Order of the White Lion, also known as the Military Order of the White Lion "For Victory", was an award established on 9 February 1945 to reward military merit, either personal acts of bravery or leadership. 

The order was presented in five different classes, the first class decorations being a gold breast star, while the second class was a silver breast star.  The third class was in the form of a silver cross, enameled in red, and worn suspended from a ribbon on the chest.  The fourth and fifth classes were a gold and silver medal respectively.  The insignia of the first and second classes borrowed heavily in design from the Order of the White Lion.  Both orders utilized an eight pointed star, with the center medallion containing the crowned white lion of the Coat of arms of Czechoslovakia.  The difference came with the color of the medallion's border and motto that it contained, being blue on the Military Order of the White Lion.  The motto was "Za vítězství" (For victory), versus the Order of the White Lion's motto of "Pravda vítezí" (Truth prevails).

Notable recipients
Alexandru Dobriceanu
Dwight D. Eisenhower
Douglas Evill
František Fajtl
Jozef Gabčík
Jan Kubiš
Jean de Lattre de Tassigny
Douglas MacArthur
Bernard Montgomery, 1st Viscount Montgomery of Alamein
Adolf Opálka
George S. Patton
James Robb
Semyon Timoshenko
Georgy Zhukov
Nikita Brilev

References

Military awards and decorations of Czechoslovakia
Awards established in 1945
1945 establishments in Czechoslovakia